Joseph Cooke (1775–1811) was the inspiration behind the Methodist Unitarian movement.

Joseph or Joe Cooke may also refer to:

 Joseph Platt Cooke (1730–1816), American military officer in the Revolutionary War and Connecticut politician
 Joseph Peter Cooke (1858–1913), lawyer and political figure in Quebec
 Joe Cooke (politician) (1904–1981), Australian Senator
 Joe Cooke (footballer) (born 1955), Dominican footballer
 Joe Cooke (basketball) (1948–2006), basketball player
 Joe Cooke (cricketer) (born 1997), English cricketer

See also 
 Joseph Cook (disambiguation)